Dispatches from Elsewhere is an American drama television series created by and starring Jason Segel that premiered on March 1, 2020, on AMC. It is based on the documentary film The Institute about the alternate reality game The Jejune Institute.

Premise
The series, set in Philadelphia, Pennsylvania, follows "a group of ordinary people who stumble onto a puzzle hiding just behind the veil of everyday life. They will come to find that the mystery winds far deeper than they ever imagined."

Cast

Main
Jason Segel as Peter, a data worker struggling to find meaning in his life
Andre Benjamin as Fredwynn, an intelligent yet paranoid man dedicated to figuring out the truth
Eve Lindley as Simone, a trans woman seeking an escape from her feelings of isolation
Richard E. Grant as Octavio Coleman, Esq., the enigmatic head of the Jejune Institute
Sally Field as Janice Foster, an optimistic empty-nester trying to reclaim her sense of identity

Recurring
Tara Lynne Barr as Young Janice
 Ceci Balagot as Clara
 Cherise Boothe as Lee
 Travis Burnett as Clown-Faced Boy
 Joe Forbrich as The Milkman
 Sean Patrick Folster as Bigfoot

Production

Development

On July 28, 2018, it was announced that AMC had given the production a series order. The series was created by Jason Segel who also directed the pilot and serves as executive producer alongside Scott Rudin, Eli Bush, and Garrett Basch. The series is based on the 2013 documentary film The Institute, which is the story of The Jejune Institute, an alternate reality game set in San Francisco.

Segel said that he chose to shoot in Philadelphia because during location scouting he was surprised to learn that the city is full of colorful public art; he said seeing the Magic Gardens for the first time was the moment he knew Philly was the right location for the show.

Early versions of the script were set in an unspecified city, and then were rewritten to be about specific Philadelphia locations.

Casting
Alongside the series order announcement in July 2018, it was announced that Jason Segel would star in the series. In April 2019, Richard E. Grant, Sally Field and Eve Lindley were added to the cast, with Andre Benjamin joining in July.

Filming
Principal photography for the series commenced in Philadelphia, Pennsylvania in July 2019.

Future
In an interview in April 2020 after the first-season finale, Jason Segel commented on the possibility of a second season: "[I]t can be either an anthology or a limited [series], depending on how we decide to proceed. But the idea is that each season is stand-alone—and without giving too much away, each season would profile a specific thing, as The Jejune Institute was profiled in the first season." By October 2021, the series was implied to be over.

Episodes

Broadcast
The series was broadcast by AMC in the United States. In the United Kingdom, it premiered on April 29, 2020, on BT TV.

Reception

Critical response
On Rotten Tomatoes, the series has an 85% rating with an average score of 7.2 out of 10 based on 39 reviews. The website's critical consensus is, "A weird and whimsical journey into the unknown, Dispatches from Elsewheres experimental approach doesn't always coalesce, but committed performances and a genuine sense of wonder make it a trip worth taking." On Metacritic, it has a score of 66 out of 100 based on 17 reviews, indicating "generally favorable reviews".

Keith Phipps of TV Guide gave it a 4/5 rating and wrote, "What is going on is no clearer at the end of the first four episodes. That also doesn't really matter all that much. The series is as intriguing as it is heartfelt thanks to stylishly imaginative storytelling and richly developed characters." Alan Sepinwall of Rolling Stone gave it a 3/5 star review and wrote, "Does Dispatches From Elsewhere earn its quirkiness? It's hard to tell based on the limited sample of episodes AMC made available to critics. But it's not boring, and its optimism is appealing in and of itself."

Accolades
For the 32nd GLAAD Media Awards, the series was nominated for Outstanding Limited or Anthology Series.

Alternate reality game (ARG) 
In October 2019, fliers promoting a fictional entity called The New Noology Network (NNN) were found in the U.S. and Canada, advertising a study on recording dreams. This directed people towards the NNN's Twitch channel apparently broadcasting patient sessions live, until it was revealed to be a farce. Shortly after, NNN reached out to get participants to record themselves doing seemingly absurd tasks, similar in nature to the instructions given to participants of The Jejune Institute.

Participants eventually figured out that this ARG was indeed directly connected to Dispatches from Elsewhere. Hidden clues in each episode starting from the second one led to clues tracking the location of a van, furthering the progress of the ARG and mirroring the search for Clara in the show. The final episode featured some of the participants' recordings of tasks from before, particularly recordings of themselves saying "I am (participant's name), and I am you", mimicking a line from the show. Segel himself was responsible for choosing which recordings to use in the finale, and contacting the chosen participants telling them to keep the secret. More clues led to a private video message from Segel thanking participants for their involvement.

ARG company Hexagram was responsible for creating the ARG with involvement from Segel, AMC's VP of digital content Kevin Dreyfuss, and AMC's director of digital media Sarah LeTrent. Hexagram enlisted Sludge to produce the live interactive content for the ARG, filming on location in New Mexico. Due to the COVID-19 pandemic, instead of a grand finale with a live audience, the remainder of the ARG was re-scripted, telling players to stay safe at home and tune in to the remaining live streams.

References

External links

2020 American television series debuts
2020s American anthology television series
2020s American drama television series
2020s American LGBT-related drama television series
AMC (TV channel) original programming
English-language television shows
Metafictional television series
Television shows filmed in Pennsylvania
Television shows set in Philadelphia
Transgender-related television shows